Nassarius alabasteroides is a species of sea snail, a marine gastropod mollusc in the family Nassariidae, the nassa mud snails or dog whelks.

Description
The length of the shell attains 24.7 mm

Distribution
Nassarius alabasteroides is found in the South Pacific Ocean, on the guyot (or sunken atoll) Banc Capel, in the Coral Sea off the Chesterfield Islands of New Caledonia.

References

 Kool H.H. 2009. Nassarius alabasteroides n. sp., a new nassarid species from the tropical South Pacific Ocean (Gastropoda: Nassariidae). Miscellanea Malacologica, 3(5): 97–100

External links

Nassariidae
Gastropods described in 2009